This is a list of notable baseball bat manufacturers, which includes manufacturers of both metal and wooden baseball bats.

A–Z

 Akadema
 Birdman Bats
 Chandler Bats
 DeMarini
 Easton
 Louisville Slugger
 Marucci Sports
 Mattingly Sports
 Mizuno
 Rawlings
 Sabre Bats
 Sam Bat
 Tater
 Viper Bats
 Warstic

References 

Manufacturers
Baseball bat